Null may refer to:

Science, technology, and mathematics

Computing
Null (SQL) (or NULL), a special marker and keyword in SQL indicating that something has no value
This symbol has no visual representation
Null device, a virtual file that discards data written to it, on Unix systems /dev/null
Null pointer or reference (sometimes written NULL, nil, or None), an object pointer (or reference) not currently set to point (or refer) to a valid object

Mathematics
Null (mathematics), a zero value in several branches of mathematics

Physics
Null (physics), a point in a field where the field quantity is zero
Null (radio), a concept in electromagnetism

Arts and media
The Null Corporation, an imprint of the band Nine Inch Nails
Null (Intronaut EP), 2006
Null (Foetus EP), 1995
Null, an identity of the character Gray Fox in the Metal Gear Solid: Portable Ops video game
Null, a villain from Teenage Mutant Ninja Turtles Adventures

People with the surname
Christopher Null (born 1971), American writer and film critic
Eduard van der Nüll (1812–1868), Austrian architect
Gary Null (born 1945), American radio host and author on alternative medicine
Keith Null (born 1985), American football player
Luke Null (born 1990), American actor and comedian

See also
Ø (disambiguation)
Null symbol (disambiguation)
0 (disambiguation)
Nil (disambiguation)
Nul (disambiguation)